Temperance River State Park is a state park of Minnesota, USA, located between the communities of Schroeder and Tofte on Highway 61 on the North Shore of Lake Superior. It has campsites, picnic areas, and hiking trails on both sides of the Temperance River.

History

The Temperance River area was first permanently inhabited by Europeans in the 1830s. Settlers had to decide what to name various geographical features. When the geographical surveyors came through the area in 1864, they noticed that one particular river ran into water which was so deep that no sand bar formed at the mouth. Because there was no "bar" that river was named "Temperance."

In the 1930s, the Civilian Conservation Corps built several overlooks at certain places along the riverside. In 1957, the state organized  of land into Temperance River State Park.

Wildlife
Visitors often view mammals such as white-tailed deer, snowshoe hare, red squirrel, beaver, red fox, river otter, moose, fisher, coyote, marten, northern flying squirrel, black bear and timber wolf. 

Birds that roam within this park would be spruce grouse, kinglets, warblers, hawks and eagles. They seasonally migrate along shores. Northern spotted owls, woodpeckers, finches, ravens and unusual water birds as well as snowy, great gray and boreal owls are spotted by visitors during winter months.

Attractions
Temperance River has two campgrounds, one on each side of the river. Both campgrounds are closer to Lake Superior than most state park campgrounds near the lake. Besides the "bar-less" mouth of the river, Temperance River has three waterfalls which can be reached by footpath.  The park is also one of four Minnesota state parks to allow rock climbing, along with nearby Tettegouche State Park.

References

External links

Temperance River State Park

1957 establishments in Minnesota
Civilian Conservation Corps in Minnesota
Protected areas established in 1957
Protected areas of Cook County, Minnesota
State parks of Minnesota